Fausto Bonzi (born 27 September 1961) is a former Italian male mountain runner, seven times world champion (two at individual level and five with the national team), at the World Mountain Running Championships.

Biography
He won five national championships at individual senior level.

Achievements

National titles
Italian Mountain Running Championships
Mountain running: 1983. 1984, 1985, 1986, 1989

References

External links
 

1961 births
Living people
Italian male mountain runners
World Mountain Running Championships winners
20th-century Italian people